The 2019 Porsche Império GT3 Cup Challenge Brasil is the first one-make Porsche racing championship in South America for 911 GT3 Cup cars and this was the fifteenth season. It began on March 16 at Autódromo José Carlos Pace and finished on November 12 at the same venue. It was first held in 2005 and follows the same formula basis used in the Porsche Supercup and Porsche Carrera Cup championships held around the world.

Race Calendar and Results

Carrera Cup

Carrera Cup 3.8

Drivers' Championship

Points are awarded for each race at an event to the driver/s of a car that completed at least 70% of the race distance and was running at the completion of the race. The sprint races has the partially top 6 reserve grid. Only the best 10 results in each series counts for the championship.

Carrera Cup

Carrera Cup 3.8

References

External links
 
 Porsche GT3 Cup Brazil at Driver Database

Porsche GT3 Cup Brasil
Porsche GT3 Cup Brasil seasons